Queen Sundeok of the Incheon Yi clan (Hangul: 순덕왕후 이씨, Hanja: 順德王后 李氏; 15 April 1094 – 21 September 1118) or formally called as Queen Mother Mungyeong was a Korean queen consort as the second wife of Yejong of Goryeo and the mother of his successor, Injong of Goryeo.

Biography

Early life
The future Queen Sundeok was born on 15 April 1094 as the second daughter of Yi Ja-gyeom (이자경) and Lady Choe, 2nd daughter of Choe Sa-chu (최사추) from the Haeju Choe clan. Since King Munjong's reign, the "Incheon Yi clan" was already produced many queens, consorts or wives for the Goryeo royal family, so it can said that she was came from a noble family.

Marriage and Palace life
She firstly entered the palace in 1108 (3rd year reign of Yejong of Goryeo) at 15 years old and given the royal title as Princess Yeondeok (연덕궁주, 延德宮主) while lived in "Yeondeok Palace" (연덕궁, 延德宮). One year later, she gave birth into their first son, Wang Hae (왕해, 王楷; the future King Injong) and while knowing this, the King sent an envoy to issue a decree and expressed his joy by giving her silverware (은기, 銀器), silk (비단), horses (말), wood (포목, 布木) and grain (곡식) while put up a token (표, 表) to pay their respects on her.

Then, in 1114, she formally became his queen consort. It was said after his first wife died, he was very sad and after married Yi, he loved and favored her very much due to her docile, intelligent, wise, soft and gentle character. Her mother, Lady Choe was formally called as "Grand Lady of the Joseon State" (조선국대부인, 朝鮮國大夫人) and her grandmother, Lady Gim was formally called as "Grand Lady of the Tongui State" (통의국대부인, 通儀國大夫人).

According to Chaebongmun after entered the palace, she set an example of marital harmony, never made a private request and gave birth to a son for generations to come, also praised for her virtues including that she took care of her husband by advising him to wake up when a rooster crows. While she was bedridden, Yejong was grieved, brought medicine and food himself. However, she died at a young age (only 24) on 21 September 1118 due to her own illness, which Yejong wept many times and even heard the admonition from her servants that he was too polite.

Beside Prince Wang Hae, they also had 2 daughters (Princess Seungdeok and Princess Heunggyeong).

Later life
Yejong personally enshrined and went out to Sinbong Gate (신봉문, 神鳳門) for see her funeral procession in Sureung Tomb (수릉,  綏陵) even though the officials told him not to do that.

For in memory of her, the King was said to prepared a private room (혼당, 魂堂) for enshrined her portrait at Anhwa Temple (안화사, 安和寺) and always visited it in February and August in the following year, also visited their Wedding Hall several times. While he went again to there for bow down, the officials strongly discouraged him, but he didn't hear them and he said,
"The memorial ceremonies were even held by the Song Dynasty's ruler. I just imitated it! Also, what's going to happen if I go to the wedding hall once?""조제의 예식은 송나라 임금도 한 적 있다. 나는 그 일을 본받은 것 뿐이다! 그리고 혼당 한번 간다고 무슨 큰일이 나는가?"
While also said that he did what he wanted to do.

In 1120, after finished mourn her, Yejong summoned the Crown Prince, his father-in-law and land governor Yi Ja-ryang to comforted and gave him goods.

After her husband's death in 1146, their only son, Wang Hae ascended the throne and married her younger sisters, which made two of them become her sisters and daughter in-laws at the same time. Their brothers were all occupied one place at the time of Injong's reign. However, after their father, Yi Ja-gyeom's deposition and exiled, those two Lady Yi were deposed from their position too as a result.

Posthumous name
After her death, she was posthumously honoured as Queen Sundeok (순덕왕후, 順德王后) and Grand Queen Mother Mungyeong (문경왕태후, 文敬王太后) after her only son ascended the throne in 1122.
In 1140, name Ja-jeong (자정, 慈靖) was added to her Posthumous name.
In her father's record on Goryeosa, she was called as an "Empress consort" (황후, 皇后).

Benefits for Incheon Yi clan

Queen Sundeok, a woman born into the highest aristocratic family at that time, was chosen and became the Queen consort and Mother of the nation, gave birth into a son who later ascended the throne and received many love from her husband, which can be said that she lived with a faithful life to the virtues demanded of her time. But, their marriage greatly enhanced the authority of Yi Ja-gyeom and the King's favor towards her also became the source of interest and power for Yi who later tried to rebels.

References

External links
Queen Sundeok on Encykorea .
Queen Sundeok on CultureContent .
Queen Sundeok on EToday News .
순덕왕후 on Doosan Encyclopedia .

1094 births
1118 deaths
Royal consorts of the Goryeo Dynasty
Korean queens consort
11th-century Korean women
12th-century Korean women